Nielsen is a Danish patronymic surname, literally meaning son of Niels, Niels being the Danish version of the Greek male given name Νικόλαος, Nikolaos (cf. Nicholas). It is the most common surname in Denmark, shared by about 5% of the population. It is also used in Norway, although the forms Nelsen and Nilsen are more common. In Sweden the parallel form is Nilsson.  Nielsen is also in use in the Faroe Islands. The frequent occurrence of Nielsen as a surname outside Denmark is due to emigration. Immigrants to English-speaking countries sometimes changed the spelling to Nielson, Nelsen, Nelson, Neilson, or Neilsen.

People
 Achintya Holte Nilsen (born 1999), Miss World Indonesia 2017
 Alice Nielsen (1872–1943), American singer
 Allan Nielsen (born 1971), Danish football player
 Amaldus Nielsen (1838–1932), Norwegian painter
 Anders Christian Nielsen Also known as A. C. Nielsen (1848–1929) Junction City, Oregon, Danish community founder
 Anders Peter Nielsen (1867–1950), Danish shooter
 Arthur Nielsen (1897–1980), American market analyst
 Asta Nielsen (1881–1972), Danish actress
 August Nielsen (1877–1956), Norwegian architect
 Axel Nielsen (chess player) (1914–2004), Danish chess master
 Benny Nielsen (born 1966), Danish swimmer
 Benny Nielsen (born 1951), Danish former footballer
 Brigitte Nielsen (born 1963), Danish actress
 Carl Nielsen (1865–1931), Danish composer
 Christopher Nielsen (born 1963), Norwegian comics artist
 Claus Nielsen (born 1964), Danish former footballer
 Claus Børge Nielsen (born 1961), Danish boxer
 Connie Nielsen (born 1965), Danish actress
 Dane Nielsen, Australian rugby league footballer
 David Nielsen (born 1976), Danish footballer
 Ebbe Nielsen (1950–2001), Danish entomologist
 Erik Charles Nielsen (born 1981), American actor and comedian
 Erik Nielsen (1924–2008), former Deputy Prime Minister of Canada, brother of Leslie
 E. Verner Nielsen (1899–1981), Danish chess master
 Frans Nielsen (born 1984), Danish Ice Hockey player
 Frederik Nielsen (born 1983), Danish tennis player
 Frida Sanggaard Nielsen (born 1998), Danish rower
 Gunnar Nielsen (athlete) (1928–1985), Danish athlete. Former world record holder over 1500 metres.
 Gunnar Nielsen (footballer born 1986), Faroese football player
 Gunnar Guillermo Nielsen, Argentine football player
 Hans Nielsen (disambiguation), multiple people
 Harald Nielsen (1941-2015) former Danish footballer
 Hartvig Nielsen (1908-unknown), Danish chess player
 Håvard Nielsen (born 1993), Norwegian footballer
 Henry Nielsen (actor) (1890–1967), Danish actor
 Henry Nielsen (athlete) (1910–1969), Danish runner
 Holger Nielsen (1866–1955), Danish Olympic competitor in various sports
 Holger Bech Nielsen (born 1941), Danish theoretical physicist
 Inga Nielsen (1946–2008), Danish singer (soprano)
 Jacob Stolt-Nielsen Jr. (1931–2015), Norwegian entrepreneur
 Jakob Nielsen (born 1957), Danish-American usability consultant
 Jakob Nielsen (1890–1959), Danish mathematician
 Jennifer A. Nielsen (born 1971), American author
 Jeppe Nielsen (born 1974), Danish freestyle swimmer
 Jerri Nielsen (1952–2009), American physician
 Jimmy Nielsen (born 1977), Danish footballer
 Joachim Nielsen (1964–2000; better known as Jokke), Norwegian rock musician and poet
 John Nielsen (disambiguation), multiple people
 Jonatan Nielsen (born 1993), Swedish professional ice hockey
 Juanita Nielsen (1937–1975), Australian publisher
 Julius Nielsen (1901–1981), Danish chess master
 Kay Nielsen (1886–1957), Danish "golden age" illustrator
 Kai Nielsen (1882–1924), Danish sculptor
 Kai Nielsen (disambiguation), multiple people
 Kai Peter Anthon Nielsen (1906–1988), better known as Kai Ewans was a Danish jazz musician
 Kirstjen Nielsen (born 1972), American government official, former White House Deputy Chief of Staff, and United States Secretary of Homeland Security
 Kurt Nielsen (1930–2011), Danish former tennis player
 Laviai Nielsen (born 1996), British athlete
 Leslie Nielsen (1926–2010), Canadian-born American film actor
 Lone Drøscher Nielsen (born 1964), Danish wildlife conservationist 
 Ludolf Nielsen (1876–1939), Danish composer, violinist, conductor and pianist
 Maria Nielsen (1882–1931), Danish historian and gymnasium headmistress
 Matthew Nielsen (born 1978), former Australian basketball player
 Michael Nielsen (born 1974), Australian-American quantum physicist and science writer
 Nicolai Niels Nielsen (1777–1854), Norwegian priest and politician
 Nicholas P. Nielsen, PE (born 1994), Professional Mechanical Engineer
 Niels Nielsen (disambiguation), multiple people
 Niels G. Stolt-Nielsen (born 1965), Norwegian business leader
 Nielsine Nielsen (1850-1916), the first female academic and physician in Denmark
 Norm Nielsen (1934-2020), American magician and businessman
 Olivia Nielsen (1852–1910), Danish trade unionist and politician
 Otto Nielsen (1909–1982), Norwegian songwriter, revue writer, cabaret singer and radio personality
 Palle Nielsen (chess player) (1929–1987), Danish chess master
 Preben Nielsen, Danish wheelchair curler
 Renata Nielsen (born 1966), Danish long jumper
 Richard Nielsen (disambiguation), multiple people
 Rick Nielsen, lead guitarist of the American rock band Cheap Trick
 Roy Nielsen (1916–1945), Norwegian resistance member during World War II
 Sanna Nielsen (born 1984), Swedish-born singer
 Signe Nielsen, American landscape architect 
 Skylar Nielsen (born 1975), American film director
 Stephanie Risdal Nielsen (born 1991), Danish curler
 Tom Nielsen, Danish curler
 Tove Nielsen (born 1941), Danish politician
 Valdemar Nielsen (1879–1954), Danish Olympic cyclist
 Walter M. Nielsen (1900–1981), American physicist
 Yngvar Nielsen (1843–1916), Norwegian historian

See also
Neilsen (disambiguation)
Neilson (name)
Nielson
Nilsen

References

Danish-language surnames
Patronymic surnames
Surnames from given names